Chono Ca Pe was a Native American chief of the Otoe tribe. He was a member of the O'Fallon delegation of 1821.

References 

Native American leaders
Otoe people
19th-century Native Americans